The High Court of South Africa is a superior court of law in South Africa. It is divided into nine provincial divisions, some of which sit in more than one location. Each High Court division has general jurisdiction over a defined geographical area in which it is situated. The decisions of a division are binding on magistrates' courts within its area of jurisdiction. The High Court has jurisdiction over all matters, but it usually only hears civil matters involving more than 400,000 rand, and serious criminal cases. It also hears any appeals or reviews from magistrates' courts and other lower courts.

The court and its divisions are constituted in their current form by the Superior Courts Act, 2013. They replaced the previous separate High Courts, which had in 1997 replaced the provincial and local divisions of the former Supreme Court of South Africa and the supreme courts of the TBVC states ("Bantustans" created by the apartheid government in the 1950s).

Important officers in a High Court division
Each division is headed by a Judge President and Deputy Judge President. The registrar keeps all the official court documents. The family advocate must be consulted on all matters involving children, as the High Court is the "upper guardian" of all children in South Africa. The Master of the High Court keeps all the records relating to people's estates (whether they are deceased or insolvent). The Sheriff delivers certain documents to the parties in a civil case, and also attaches property when a warrant is issued. The Director of Public Prosecutions, who used to be called the Attorney-General, is responsible for criminal prosecutions by the state. The State Attorney is the lawyer who represents the state in civil actions (where the state is suing or being sued).

Divisions

The Superior Courts Act, 2013, divides the High Court into nine divisions, one for each province. Some divisions have multiple seats of the court; the main seat has jurisdiction over the whole province, while the local seats have concurrent jurisdiction over some part of the province. The divisions are:

 The Eastern Cape Division at Grahamstown with local seats at Bhisho, Mthatha and Port Elizabeth
 The Free State Division at Bloemfontein
 The Gauteng Division at Pretoria with a local seat at Johannesburg
 The KwaZulu-Natal Division at Pietermaritzburg with a local seat at Durban
 The Limpopo Division at Polokwane with local seats at Thohoyandou and Lephalale
 The Mpumalanga Division at Mbombela with a local seat at Middelburg
 The North West Division at Mahikeng
 The Northern Cape Division at Kimberley
 The Western Cape Division at Cape Town

Circuit Court
Circuit Courts are also part of the High Court. They sit at least twice a year, moving around to serve more rural areas.

References

 
Courts of South Africa